Hampsthwaite is a large village and civil parish in Nidderdale in the Harrogate district of North Yorkshire, England. In the 2011 census the parish had a population of 1,083.

The centre of the village is designated as a Conservation Area.  Hampsthwaite lies just outside the Nidderdale Area of Outstanding Natural Beauty, but the area to the north and west of the village is recognised as an Area of Great Landscape Value.

History 
The toponym is of Old Norse origin, and means "clearing (thwaite) of a man named Hamal".

In 1304, Edward I granted a charter to Hampsthwaite to hold an annual market and fair on the Feast of St Thomas the Martyr.  The ancient parish of Hampsthwaite covered a wide area, and included the townships of Birstwith, Felliscliffe, Menwith with Darley and Thornthwaite with Padside.  All these places became separate civil parishes in 1866.

Hampsthwaite was in the West Riding of Yorkshire until 1974, when it was transferred to the new county of North Yorkshire.

Amenities 
Hampsthwaite has a Village Room, the Memorial Hall for larger events, a post office, a shop, and a pub, the Joiners' Arms and Hampsthwaite Church of England Primary School (established in 1860).

Church 
The parish church is dedicated to St Thomas Becket.  The tower is from the 15th century, but the remainder was restored in Perpendicular style in 1902.  It is a Grade II listed building.

Football Clubs
Hampsthwaite and Birstwith Junior Football Club is run for the benefit of children living, or attending school, within the Hampsthwaite and Birstwith area catering for boys and girls 6 to 11. Saturday morning coaching sessions are run in Hampsthwaite on Feast Field.

Hampsthwaite United Football Club has been known to exist since approximately 1954. Recent honours include the Harrogate & District Football League Division Two Championship in 2013 & Division One in 2015. The Club now play in the West Yorkshire Association Football League, Tier 13 of the National League System.

Notable residents
 Leeds brewer Joshua Tetley was buried in Hampsthwaite in 1859.
 Thomas Thackeray (1693–1760) was born in Hampsthwaite, the son of a yeoman of the parish, and was the great-grandfather of the author William Makepeace Thackeray.
 The family of Amy Woodforde-Finden (1860–1919), who was best known as the composer of "Kashmiri Song" from The Four Indian Love Lyrics, poems by Laurence Hope, lived in Hampsthwaite. Amy was buried here, and a memorial to her, a recumbent figure in white marble, is in the parish church. In commemoration of Amy, an annual music festival is held at St Thomas à Becket Church.

References

External links 

Hampsthwaite and Nidderdale Vital Records
Hampsthwaite Village Web Site
St Thomas a Becket Church, Hampsthwaite Web Site

Villages in North Yorkshire
Civil parishes in North Yorkshire
Nidderdale